Charles Stuart, that man of blood was a phrase used by Independents, during the English Civil War to describe King Charles I.

The phrase is derived from the Bible:

This and another verse were used to justify regicide:

Windsor Castle prayer meeting
Although the phrase had been used for a number of years by Independents, it became politically significant in April 1648 during the three-day prayer meeting at Windsor Castle by the leadership of the New Model Army. The Army leadership felt deeply betrayed by the King because they thought that while they had been negotiating in good faith he had duplicitously gone behind their backs in making  The Engagement with the Scots and encouraging a new civil war. At the end of the meeting the Grandees of the Army accepted that it was their duty "to call Charles Stuart, that man of blood, to an account for that blood he had shed, and mischief he had done".

See also
High Court of Justice for the trial of Charles I

Notes

References
Thomas N. Corns. The Royal Image: Representations of Charles I Cambridge University Press, 1999, 
Martin Dzelzainis. Anti-monarchism in English Republicanism
David Farr. Henry Ireton and the English Revolution,  Boydell Press, 2006 , 
Peter Gaunt, The English Civil War: The Essential Readings, Blackwell Publishing, 2000. , . Chapter 19 Charles Stuart, that man of blood. (Originally published in Journal of British Studies 16 (1977):41-61)
Martin van Gelderen, Quentin Skinner. Republicanism: A Shared European Heritage, Cambridge University Press, 2002, 
A. F. Kirkpatrick (1890), The Second Book of Samuel, READ BOOKS (re-publisher),

Further reading
Newton Key & Robert Bucholz. Sources and Debates in English History, 1485-1714, Blackwell Publishing, 2004. , . p. 185
Clive Holmes. Why was Charles I Executed?  Continuum International Publishing Group, 2006 , . p.18
Laura Lunger Knoppers. Puritanism and Its Discontents, University of Delaware Press, 2003 , . p. 43 Cromewell Gidion Galatians act 2 and 2 Corinthians.
Keith Lindley. The English Civil War and Revolution: A Sourcebook, Routledge, 1998 , . p.167.
David Lawrence Smith, A History of the Modern British Isles, 1603-1707: The Double Crown, Blackwell Publishing, 1998 ,  p. 158

English Civil War
1649 in England